Shahid Ali Qambrani (born 2 February 1978) is a former Pakistani cricketer who played first-class cricket for several teams in Pakistan from 1998-99 to 2011-12.

Qambrani played several matches for the Pakistan Under-19 team in 1996 and 1997, opening the batting against the Under-19 teams of West Indies, England and South Africa.

He made his first-class debut in 1998-99 for Hyderabad in the Quaid-e-Azam Trophy. In his sixth match, a few days after turning 21, he captained the team for the first time, scored his first century, and led Hyderabad to their first victory of the season by one wicket.

In 2001-02 he captained Dadu to second place in the sub-first-class Grade II division of the Quaid-e-Azam Trophy. He was the most successful batsman in the tournament. When Dadu were promoted to first-class status for the 2002-03 season, he retained the captaincy, and led the team's batting with 257 runs at 25.70, but Dadu won no matches and lost their first-class status after the season. They won one match in the one-day tournament, in which Qambrani scored 112 not out in a 10-run victory over Lahore Blues and shared the Man of the match award.

Qambrani had his most prolific season in 2006-07 when he scored 686 runs at an average of 32.66, playing for Pakistan Customs, Hyderabad and Sindh. His highest score was 150 not out, scored for Hyderabad against Islamabad in 2009-10. It was the last of his eight first-class centuries.

He last played first-class and List A cricket in 2011-12.

References

External links
 Shahid Qambrani at CricketArchive
 
 Portrait of Shahid Qambrani

1978 births
Living people
Pakistani cricketers
Sindh cricketers
Hyderabad (Pakistan) cricketers
Pakistan National Shipping Corporation cricketers
Pakistan Customs cricketers
People from Jamshoro District
Dadu cricketers